The Polaris Music Prize is a music award annually given to the best full-length Canadian album based on artistic merit, regardless of genre, sales, or record label. The award was established in 2006 with a $20,000 cash prize; the prize was increased to $30,000 for the 2011 award. In May 2015, the Polaris Music Prize was increased to $50,000, an additional $20,000, sponsored by Slaight Music. Additionally, second place prizes for the nine other acts on the Short List increased from $2,000 to $3,000. Polaris officials also announced The Slaight Family Polaris Heritage Prize, an award that "will annually honour five albums from the five decades before Polaris launched in 2006." Details about the selection process for this prize are still to be revealed.

The Polaris Music Prize is modeled after the United Kingdom/Ireland's Mercury Prize and in turn, inspired the Atlantis Music Prize/Borealis Music Prize for Newfoundland and Labrador.

Jury and selection process
There is no submission process or entry fee for the Polaris Music Prize. Jurors select what they consider the five best Canadian albums released in the previous year. The ballots are tabulated with each number one pick awarded five points, a number two pick awarded four points and so on. A long list of 40 titles is classified, released in mid-June and promoted to the public. The long list is then sent back to the jury. The jurors then re-submit five top picks from this long list.

These ballots are re-tabulated and the top ten titles form the Polaris short list. This list is released in early July and promoted to the public. A smaller group of 11 jury members ("The Grand Jury") who convene in Toronto at the Polaris Music Prize gala in late September decide the ultimate winner. The decision is finalized during the gala as the nominated bands perform. Grand jurors are selected so that each shortlisted album has one person in the jury room to advocate for it; ten are selected on the basis of having named one of the shortlisted albums as their top pick in the balloting, while the remaining jury position is given to a person who did not vote for any of the shortlisted albums at all.

Polaris Music Prize board of directors selects the jurors. The jury list includes more than 200 Canadian music journalists, bloggers, and broadcasters. To ensure an impartial outcome, no one with direct financial relationships with artists is eligible to become a jury member. The organization itself is a registered, not-for-profit corporation. Another key benefit of enlisting music journalists, broadcasters and bloggers as judges is that increased media coverage draws attention to quality music in a cluttered commercial landscape and an increasingly fractured music scene.

Notable jurors have included former MuchMusic VJs Hannah Sung and Hannah Simone, and Toronto Star music columnist Ben Rayner. Some of the 2018 judges include Lana Gay (Indie88), Mike Bell (YYSCENE), Stuart Derdeyn (Vancouver Province), Stephen Cooke (The Chronicle Herald), Brad Wheeler (The Globe and Mail), Alan Ranta (Exclaim!), Alan Cross (102.1 the edge), CBC Radio personalities  Sandra Sperounes, Melody Lau, Lisa Christiansen and Raina Douris and Mitch Pollock, Voir music journalists Patrick Baillargeon and Olivier Boisvert-Magnen, Kimberly Cleave (APTN/Digital Drum) and Carl Wilson.

On November 3, 2014, Jian Ghomeshi, the disgraced former CBC Q host and host of the first Polaris Gala, was removed from the Polaris juror pool. Polaris officials made no official announcement on the subject.

Polaris Winners and short list nominees

Slaight Family Polaris Heritage Prize
In 2015, the Polaris jury also launched the Polaris Heritage Prize now known as the Slaight Family Polaris Heritage Prize, an annual award program to honour classic Canadian albums released prior to the creation of the Polaris Prize. Since its inception, the voting categories for Heritage Prize-nominated albums as well as the number of designated albums declared each year have changed multiple times.

In the first year, the Heritage Prizes were awarded in the categories 1960s-70s, 1980s, 1990s and 2000-2005, selected by public vote from a shortlist of five nominees put forward by a Heritage Prize jury. In the second year, the process and categories were revised with the initial shortlists increased to 10, the categories shifted to 1960-75, 1976–85, 1986-1995 and 1996-2005, and the addition of a second prize to be selected by a critical jury alongside the winner of the public vote. The purpose of the jury award is to ensure that albums which were artistically important, but not necessarily as commercially popular, still have a fair shot at being selected as winners; to ensure that two different albums are selected, however, the jury does not meet to vote on its choice until after the popular vote winner has been determined.

Between 2015-18, non-winning nominees in a Heritage Prize category were renominated again, reincorporating all of the non-winning nominees from the previous year, with only the winning albums replaced by new titles. In 2019 Polaris chose to do away with the four time period format, reducing the total number of nominated albums from 40 to 12 and putting those 12 albums in one single category with no separation by time period. There was one public vote album winner and one jury vote winner in 2019. Non-winning albums can still be renominated in a future year, although the shortlists have shown increased variability since the category reduction.

Slaight Family Polaris Heritage Prize winners

Ceremonies 
The 2018 Polaris sponsors include the CBC, the Government of Canada, FACTOR, Ontario Media Development Corporation, Slaight Communications, Radio Starmaker Fund, SiriusXM, Stingray Music/Galaxie, The Carlu, Shure Canada, Toronto radio station Indie88, SOCAN, and Re-Sound20. Past sponsors have included Rogers Communications and Scion.

The Polaris Music Prize gala is video streamed live on CBC Music and, previously, AUX.

Presentation venues
 Phoenix Concert Theatre 2006–2008
 Masonic Temple 2009–2012
 The Carlu 2013–present

Controversies

The Polaris Music Prize can be the subject of intense scrutiny from fans, media and music industry insiders. A number of recurring debates have emerged throughout Polaris' history. Some of these include: perception the prize is either too "indie" or too "mainstream," concern about gender balance amongst nominees and jurors, concern about racial balance amongst nominees and jurors, concern about geographical representation amongst nominees and jurors, and concern about fair representation of specific musical genres. These topics are discussed at length during the open-to-the-public "Polaris Salons" which usually feature Polaris jurors as panellists in various cities across North America during the lead-up to each year's Polaris Gala.

Polaris Prize winners are often the centre of specific controversies as well.

 2009: Publishing the words "Fucked Up." When Fucked Up won in 2009 many mainstream media outlets were forced to wrestle with how they would present the band's name. The Canoe.ca news service used the headline "F***** Up (language alert , language alert below) wins the 2009 Polaris Music Prize on Monday night," The Globe and Mail went with "Toronto hardcore band wins Polaris Music Prize," while The New Yorkers "The Prize That Dare Not Speak Its Name" monitored what they called "semantic yoga."
 2013: Godspeed You! Black Emperor refused to attend the 2013 Polaris gala. When the band won for their album Allelujah! Don't Bend! Ascend!, representatives from their label Constellation Records accepted the $30,000 prize on their behalf. Constellation's Don Wilkie said in a statement, "Godspeed will use the prize money to purchase musical instruments for, and support organizations providing music lessons to, people incarcerated within the Quebec prison system." The next day the band released their own statement, saying "holding a gala during a time of austerity and normalized decline is a weird thing to do" and that "maybe the next celebration should happen in a cruddier hall, without the corporate banners and culture overlords." This was also the first year the Polaris winners were not presented with what had up until that point been a traditional giant novelty cheque to represent their victory. The presenting of the giant novelty cheque has since been discontinued.
 2014: During Tanya Tagaq's victory speech she declared "Fuck PETA," in reference to the organization for the People for the Ethical Treatment of Animals. Tagaq also used her gala performance and post-Polaris victory interviews as a platform to discuss the instances of missing and murdered Aboriginal women across Canada.
2017: Lido Pimienta's acceptance speech was capped with an unexpected, obscenity-spiked outburst about her monitors being off during her performance. "All of my f**king monitors were off," Pimienta shouted into the microphone at the end of the show, which was webcast by the CBC. Earlier she performed two songs live. "I could not hear myself when I was up here. I’m f**king pissed off. Thank you though, mother f**ker."

Polaris Prize music releases
In 2006, compilation CD/souvenir program guides featuring one song each from every shortlisted artist were given out at the Polaris Gala. The same was done in 2007 with all shortlisted artists contributing to the compilation CD except Arcade Fire. Between 2008 and 2011, the souvenir program guides instead included download cards for recipients to obtain one song from each of the shortlisted artists.

Polaris began releasing promotional split seven-inch singles beginning in 2012 which were separate from the souvenir program guides. These singles were often given away through campaigns with independent record stores, via contests, at Polaris Salons, or at Polaris Galas.

In recent years, the Polaris Prize has also sponsored a series of promotional singles involving nominated or winning musicians. The "Polaris Cover Sessions" series features past nominees recording a cover of a song by another nominee or Heritage Prize winner, while the "Polaris Collaboration Sessions" series features two past nominees collaborating on new original songs.2012Grimes "Genesis" + Handsome Furs "Serve The People" on grey vinyl
Kathleen Edwards "Going to Hell" + Cold Specks "Blank Maps" on white vinyl
Japandroids "The House That Heaven Built" + Cadence Weapon "Conditioning" on yellow vinyl
Fucked Up "What Would You Do (For Veronica)?" + YAMANTAKA // SONIC TITAN "Queens" on orange-red vinyl

Feist and Drake did not participate.2013 Tegan And Sara "I Was A Fool" + A Tribe Called Red "The Road ft. Black Bear" on orange vinyl
 Zaki Ibrahim "Draw The Line" + Whitehorse "Achilles' Desire" on white vinyl
 Purity Ring "Fineshrine" + Colin Stetson "High Above A Grey Green Sea" on purple vinyl
 Metric "Dreams So Real" + Young Galaxy "Pretty Boy" on blue vinyl
 METZ "Get Off" on yellow vinyl

Godspeed You! Black Emperor did not participate.2014 YAMANTAKA // SONIC TITAN "Windflower" + Tanya Tagaq "Umingmak" on white vinyl 
 Shad "Progress (Part 1: American Pie)" + Mac DeMarco "Brother" on red/orange vinyl 
 Owen Pallett "The Riverbed" + Arcade Fire "Normal Person" on blue vinyl 
 Basia Bulat "Never Let Me Go" + Timber Timbre "Grand Canyon" on yellow vinyl 
 Jessy Lanza "Move Closer" (previously physically unreleased) on "trippy pattern" grey vinyl

Drake did not participate.2015Polaris Cover Sessions No. 1 (2015) [10 inch]
 Sarah Harmer, "Odessa" (Caribou)
 Whitehorse, "The Bones of an Idol" (The New Pornographers)
 Great Lake Swimmers, "I'm a Mountain" (Sarah Harmer)2016Polaris Cover Sessions No. 2 (2016) [10 inch]
 Arkells, "I Am Not Afraid" (Owen Pallett)
 Zaki Ibrahim, "Show Me the Place" (Leonard Cohen)
 Joel Plaskett, "Bittersweet Melodies" (Feist)2017Polaris Cover Sessions No. 3 (2017) [10 inch]
 Little Scream, "Anew Day" (Mary Margaret O’Hara)
 Hannah Georgas, "Crown of Love" (Arcade Fire)
 Les soeurs Boulay, "Complainte pour Ste-Catherine" (Kate & Anna McGarrigle)2018Polaris Cover Sessions No. 4 (2018) [10 inch]
 Jean-Michel Blais, "Mushaboom" (Feist)
 Weaves, "Neighborhood #3 (Power Out)" (Arcade Fire)
 Lindi Ortega, "Suzanne" (Leonard Cohen)2019'''Polaris Cover Sessions No. 5 (2019) [12 inch]
 Faith Healer, "When You Awake" (The Band)
 Partner, "Limelight" (Rush)
 Pierre Kwenders, "It Ain't Fair" (Jean-Pierre Ferland)

 Polaris collaboration sessions 
Polaris, the Banff Centre and Scion Sessions teamed up for a collaborative residency project featuring past shortlisted artists Shad and Holy Fuck. The result was the Scion Sessions-sponsored Holy Shad "Legend of Cy Borg Parts I and II" seven-inch single as well as a documentary video produced by AUX TV.

In 2017, Buffy Sainte-Marie and Tanya Tagaq collaborated on the single "You Got to Run (Spirit of the Wind)". A remix of the song by A Tribe Called Red was commissioned for the seven-inch release. The song was subsequently included on Sainte-Marie's album Medicine Songs''.

In 2019, The Weather Station and Jennifer Castle came together to record a two-song split-single. The Weather Station's song was "I Tried To Wear The World (featuring Jennifer Castle)" and Castle's was "Midas Touch (featuring The Weather Station)."

See also 

Canadian rock
 Choice Music Prize (Ireland)
 Mercury Music Prize (United Kingdom and Ireland)
 Australian Music Prize (Australia)
 Prix Constantin (France)
 Shortlist Prize (United States)
 Nordic Music Prize (Nordic countries)

References

External links
 

 
Canadian music awards
Awards established in 2006
CBC Radio 3 programs
2006 in Canadian music